Aporophyla chioleuca is a moth of the family Noctuidae. It was described by Gottlieb August Wilhelm Herrich-Schäffer in 1850. It is found in Portugal, Spain and Greece, as well as on Sardinia, Sicily, Malta and Crete.

Subspecies
Aporophyla chioleuca chioleuca
Aporophyla chioleuca sammuti Fibiger, Yela, Zilli & Ronkay 2010 (Portugal, Malta)

References

External links
"Aporophyla chioleuca (Herrich-Schaffer, 1850)". Insecta.pro.
Lepiforum e.V.

Moths described in 1850
Aporophyla
Moths of Europe
Taxa named by Gottlieb August Wilhelm Herrich-Schäffer